Soma Holiday is the first full-length major label release by the American alternative rock band Greenwheel, released in 2002 on Island Records.

Track listing
 "Shelter" 
 "Sustain You" 
 "Breathe" 
 "Louder Than Words" 
 "Strong"
 "Drowning Man"
 "Faces"
 "Identity"
 "Disappear"
 "Dim Halo"
 "Radiance"
 "The End"

In Japan, the album was released with a bonus track entitled "Flood".

The song "Shelter" also appears on the soundtrack albums to the films The Fast and the Furious (2001) and Music from and Inspired by Spider-Man (2002).
The song "Strong" is featured in the video game NHL 2003.

The song "Breathe" was covered by Melissa Etheridge, which garnered her a Grammy nomination in 2005.

Use in Public Media
The song "Louder Than Words" is a common ending to the popular podcast Distorted View Daily.

Notes 

2002 debut albums
Greenwheel albums
Island Records albums